The Jackson County Apple Festival is an annual festival dedicated to the apple held in Jackson, Ohio, United States. The festival was created to promote Jackson County's leading agricultural product, which at the time was grown by over forty farms in the area.

Dates
The Apple Festival is held on the third weekend in September.  The festival starts at noon on Tuesday and ends on Saturday night.

Locations
Starting on the Saturday before the festival, downtown streets (Broadway St. between Water St. and Walnut St.; Main St. between Columbia St. and Portsmouth St.; and Pearl St. between Church St. and Portsmouth St.) are closed in Jackson.  They are reopened by 5:00 pm on Sunday.

History
In the spring of 1937, a group of members from the Jackson Chamber of Commerce decided to create a festival that would help promote the county's leading industry.

The Apple Festival has been held annually since 1937, but was silenced from 1942 to 1945 during World War II & 2020 caused by COVID-19 pandemic.

Traditions
The Friday night home high-school football game at Jackson High School during the week of the festival, is dubbed "The Apple Bowl."

Several parades are held during the festival.  A school parade is held on Wednesday afternoon.  Wednesday evening is the Opening Parade.  Thursday at noon is the Pre-School Parade.

The Saturday night "Grande Finale" Parade is the festival's biggest event with over 70,000 people attending, and has a claim as "the largest lighted parade in Ohio."  The parade annually includes local dignitaries and politicians, neighboring festival royalty, and invited high school marching bands from across southern and southeastern Ohio and northern West Virginia; as well as "floats" from each of the elementary schools in and around Jackson, which depict the annual theme of the festival.  The Budweiser Clydesdale Horses have been a part of this parade two times during the 1990s.  On September 21, 2001, The Ohio State University Marching Band (TBDBITL) performed a halftime field show at the Jackson High School football field, and that night marched in the Festival parade for the first time; the Ohio State Alumni Band has also made several appearances in the parade lineup.  The U.S. Marine Corps Band appeared in the 2007 parade.

Another long-standing tradition of the Jackson County Apple Festival is a pageant for the Apple Festival Queen.

List of Apple Festival Queens
 1937: Jean Clark
 1938: Alta Swingle
 1939: Betty Richards
 1940: Ruth Horton
 1941: Helen Woodruff
(World War II hiatus)
 1946: Nancy Schellenger
 1947: Pat May
 1948: Ruth Ann Hixon
 1949: Carolyn Conroy
 1950: Phyllis Claar
 1951: Marjorie Downard
 1952: Shirley Walburn
 1953: Melva Finch
 1954: Edna Burton
 1955: Phyllis Mullins
 1956: Pat Richards
 1957: Vivian Patterson
 1958: Janet Corvin
 1959: Beverly Varchmin
 1960: Henrietta Fulton
 1961: Paula Hess
 1962: Carolyn Myers
 1963: Barbara Sergent
 1964: Janet Simpson
 1965: Sue Surface
 1966: Kathy Richards
 1967: Linda Crabtree
 1968: Brenda Dalton
 1969: Lynn Morgan
 1970: Connie Tucker (became Miss Ohio Festivals)
 1970: Lin Schneider (replaced Connie Tucker)
 1971: Jan Russ
 1972: Drema Crawford
 1973: Stephanie Davis
 1974: Iris Wardlow
 1975: Mary Rupert
 1976: Noreena Maynard
 1977: Tammy Baisden
 1978: Susan Ridge
 1979: Sheryl Tolliver
 1980: Jill Martin
 1981: Sharon Dearing
 1982: Carla Cooper
 1983: Lisa Humphreys
 1984: Barbie Britton
 1985: Tammy Hill
 1986: Christina Hill
 1987: Michelle Tackett
 1988: Leigh Ann Cox
 1989: Sarah Sheward
 1990: Gwen Wood
 1991: Jodie Brown
 1992: Susan Moore
 1993: Christy Warrens
 1994: Marlana Malone
 1995: Alicia Parker
 1996: Bethany Hodge
 1997: Nicole Fulton
 1998: Julie Murray
 1999: Sarah Williamson
 2000: Kristi Sturgill
 2001: Jenny Bragg
 2002: Erikka Jo Alcantara
 2003: Courtney Wills
 2004: Rikki Atwood
 2005: Shara Lahrmer
 2006: Kayla McMillen
 2007: Sarah Newkirk
 2008: Candace Chapman
 2009: Allyson Seitz
 2010: Taryn Strawser
 2011: Karena Fulks
 2012: JoBeth Winchester
 2013: Karleigh Atwood
 2014: Logan Woodyard
 2015: Maddie Campbell
 2015: Lexie Webb (replaced Maddie Campbell)
 2016: Tori Leonard
 2017: Alyssa Proehl
 2018: Briley Lusk
 2019: Madison Strawser
(COVID-19 pandemic hiatus in 2020)
 2021: Kaydee Brown

See also
 List of festivals in the United States

External links
 The Official Jackson Apple Festival Website
 The Apple of Ohio's Eye - Aug. 31, 2005
 WSAZ: Football Nights and Apple Delights - Sept. 18, 2007
 Ohio Festival & Events Association Membership
 Britannica.com on Ohio culture, including Apple Festival

Festivals in Ohio
Tourist attractions in Jackson County, Ohio
1937 establishments in Ohio
Food and drink festivals in the United States
Recurring events established in 1937
Apple festivals
Festivals established in 1937
Apple Festival